Events from the year 1878 in Germany.

Incumbents

National level
 Kaiser – William I
 Chancellor – Otto von Bismarck

State level

Kingdoms
 King of Bavaria – Ludwig II of Bavaria
 King of Prussia – Kaiser William I
 King of Saxony – Albert of Saxony
 King of Württemberg – Charles I of Württemberg

Grand Duchies
 Grand Duke of Baden – Frederick I
 Grand Duke of Hesse – Louis IV
 Grand Duke of Mecklenburg-Schwerin – Frederick Francis II
 Grand Duke of Mecklenburg-Strelitz – Frederick William
 Grand Duke of Oldenburg – Peter II
 Grand Duke of Saxe-Weimar-Eisenach – Charles Alexander

Principalities
 Schaumburg-Lippe – Adolf I, Prince of Schaumburg-Lippe
 Schwarzburg-Rudolstadt – George Albert, Prince of Schwarzburg-Rudolstadt
 Schwarzburg-Sondershausen – Gonthier Frederick Charles II, Prince of Schwarzburg-Sondershausen
 Principality of Lippe – Woldemar, Prince of Lippe
 Reuss Elder Line – Heinrich XXII, Prince Reuss of Greiz
 Reuss Younger Line – Heinrich XIV, Prince Reuss Younger Line
 Waldeck and Pyrmont –– George Victor, Prince of Waldeck and Pyrmont

Duchies
 Duke of Anhalt – Frederick I, Duke of Anhalt
 Duke of Brunswick – William, Duke of Brunswick
 Duke of Saxe-Altenburg – Ernst I, Duke of Saxe-Altenburg
 Duke of Saxe-Coburg and Gotha – Ernst II, Duke of Saxe-Coburg and Gotha
 Duke of Saxe-Meiningen – Georg II, Duke of Saxe-Meiningen

Events
 13 July – Congress of Berlin
 13 July– Treaty of Berlin
 30 July – German federal election, 1878
 19 October – First Anti-Socicalist law passed by the German Reichstag

Births

 4 January – Gerdt von Bassewitz, German playwright and actor (died 1923)
 16 March – Clemens August Graf von Galen, German bishop of Roman-Catholic Church (died 1946)
 1 April – Carl Sternheim, German playwright and short story writer (died 1942)
 6 April – Erich Mühsam, German poet and playwright (died 1934)
 21 April – Albert Weisgerber, German painter (died 1915)
 10 May – Gustav Stresemann, Chancellor 1923, Foreign Minister 1923–29, Nobel laureate (died 1929)
 30 May – Hermine Körner, German actress (died 1960)
 4 June – Ludwig Dürr, German airship designer (died 1956)
 10 July – Otto Freundlich, German painter, sculptor (died 1943)
 16 July – Andreas Hermes, German politician (died 1964)
 26 July – Ernst Hoppenberg, German swimmer (died 1937)
 10 August – Alfred Döblin, German novelist, essayist and writer (died 1957)
 13 August – Arthur Biram, Israeli philosopher, philologist, and educator (died 1967)
 17 August – Paul Troost, German architect (died 1934)
 2 September – Werner von Blomberg, German Minister of War, and Commander-in-Chief of the German Armed Forces (died 1946)
 16 September – Karl Albiker, German sculptor (died 1961)
 26 September – Kurt von Hammerstein-Equord, German general (died 1943)
 29 October – Alexander von Falkenhausen, German general (died 1966)
 30 October – Arthur Scherbius, German electrical engineer (died 1929)
 21 November – Gustav Radbruch, German legal scholar and politician (died 1949)
 15 December – Hans Carossa, German novelist (died 1956)
 30 December – Rudolf Petersen, German politician (died 1962)

Deaths

 8 March – Wilhelm Siegmund Teuffel, German classical scholar (born 1820)
 20 March – Julius von Mayer, German physician and physicist (born 1814)
 23 March – Ernst Keil, German journalist and publisher (born 1816)
 25 May – Andreas von Ettingshausen, German mathematician and physicist (born 1796)
 12 June – George V of Hanover, last King of Hanover (born 1819)
 12 September – Friedrich August von Alberti, German geologist (born 1795)
 25 September – August Heinrich Petermann, German cartographer (born 1822)
 4 October – Johannes Rebmann, German missionary (born 1820)
 4 November – Ludwig Meyn, German agricultural scientist, soil scientist, geologist, journalist and mineralogist (born 1820)
 17 November – Karl Theodor Keim, Protestant theologian (born 1825)
 10 December – Heinrich Burgers, German journalist and politician (born 1820)
 14 December - Grand Duchess of Hesse and by Rhine (born 1843 in the United Kingdom)
 16 December – Richard Hartmann, German engineering manufacturer (born 1809)

References

 
Years of the 19th century in Germany
Germany
Germany